Matshidiso Mathews Botswe is a South African politician who has been the provincial chairperson of the Economic Freedom Fighters since his election in September 2018. He has been serving as a Member of the North West Provincial Legislature since May 2019. Prior to serving in the legislature, he was a councillor in the Ditsobotla Local Municipality.

In February 2020, Botswe was physically assaulted while he was being escorted out of the chamber for disrupting premier Job Mokgoro's State of the Province Address.

References

Living people
Year of birth missing (living people)
Tswana people
Economic Freedom Fighters politicians
Members of the North West Provincial Legislature